Jarvis Lamar Varnado (born March 1, 1988) is an American professional basketball player for Piratas de La Guaira of the Venezuelan Basketball League. Varnado is known as a defensive specialist and is especially adept at shot blocking where he's aided by his large wingspan.

Early life
Varnado graduated from Haywood High School in Brownsville, Tennessee in 2006.

Considered a four-star recruit by Rivals.com, Varnado was listed as the No. 16 power forward and the No. 62 player in the nation in 2006.

College career
Varnado played for Mississippi State in the Southeastern Conference (SEC) of the NCAA Division I from 2006 to 2010.

He led the NCAA in blocks for the 2007–08 season with 157 blocks, tying Shaquille O'Neal for the most blocks in a season in the SEC. In the 2008–09 season, he would break that single season record with 170 blocks.

On November 21, 2009, Varnado became the SEC's all-time career block record holder with 413 total blocks in his career. This passed O'Neal's career block record of 412. On January 23, 2010, Varnado surpassed Adonal Foyle on the NCAA's Division I all-time career blocks list to become the second-leading shot-blocker. Needing 8 blocks for the record, Varnado became the NCAA's Division I all-time shot blocker against Alabama on February 24, 2010 passing Wojciech Myrda's record of 535 career blocks.

Varnado was named SEC Defensive Player of the Year in 3 consecutive years (2008, 2009 and 2010) becoming the first person to ever do so.
He is one of just two college players in history to achieve the milestone of 1,000 points, 1,000 rebounds and 500 blocks (along with David Robinson).

Professional career

Carmatic Pistoia (2010–2011) 
Varnado was drafted by the Miami Heat with the 41st pick in the 2010 NBA draft. However, he signed to play with Carmatic Pistoia, an Italian team playing in the second-division. Varnado played 33 games with Pistoia and averaged 15.4 points, 8.9 rebounds, and 3.1 blocks per game.

Hapoel Jerusalem (2011–2012) 
Varnado participated in minicamps with the Heat during the summer of 2011. On August 12, 2011, he signed a contract with Hapoel Jerusalem of Israeli Basketball Super League. After playing 12 games for the club in all competitions, on January 24, 2012, Varnado left the team.

Virtus Roma (2012) 
After he exited Jerusalem, Varnado signed with Virtus Roma of the Italian first division Serie A.

Sioux Falls Skyforce (2012) 
On September 7, 2012, Varnado was signed by the Heat for workouts. He was waived on October 26, 2012. After being waived by the Heat, Varnado joined the Sioux Falls Skyforce of the NBA Development League. Varnado was named D-League player of the week for the first week of the 2012–13 season.

Boston Celtics (2012–2013) 
On December 24, 2012, Varnado was signed by the Boston Celtics. On January 6, 2013, he was waived by the Celtics.

Miami Heat (2013) 
On January 9, 2013, Varnado accepted a 10-day contract with the Miami Heat, the same team that drafted him in 2010. He was signed to a second 10-day contract on January 20, 2013, and was signed for the rest of the season on January 30. The Heat sent him to the Sioux Falls Skyforce for assignments in March and April 2013. Varnado won his first NBA championship with the Heat when they defeated the San Antonio Spurs 4-3 in the 2013 NBA Finals.

On October 21, 2013, Varnado was waived by the Heat.

Iowa Energy (2013–2014) 
On October 31, 2013, Varnado was re-acquired by the Sioux Falls Skyforce. The next day, he was traded to the Iowa Energy. On February 3, 2014, Varnado was named to the Prospects All-Star roster for the 2014 NBA D-League All-Star Game.

Chicago Bulls (2014) 
On February 18, 2014, Varnado signed a 10-day contract with the Chicago Bulls. On February 28, 2014, the Bulls decided not to sign Varnado to a second 10-day contract.

Philadelphia 76ers (2014) 
On March 1, 2014, Varnado signed a 10-day contract with the Philadelphia 76ers. On March 12, 2014, he signed with the 76ers for the rest of the season. On March 29, 2014, he recorded a career high 9 points and 6 blocks in a 123-98 win over the Detroit Pistons. On October 7, 2014, he was waived by the 76ers.

Los Angeles D-Fenders (2014–2015) 
Varnado's D-League rights were traded by the Iowa Energy to the Los Angeles D-Fenders on December 30, 2014. He joined the side and averaged 11.6 points in eight games.

Piratas de Quebradillas (2015) 
On April 21, 2015, after the end of the 2014–15 D-League season, Varnado signed with Piratas de Quebradillas of Puerto Rico for the rest of the 2015 BSN season.

Dinamo Sassari (2015–2016) 
On July 22, 2015, Varnado signed a one-year deal with Dinamo Sassari to play in the Serie A and the European first tier EuroLeague.

Istanbul Büyükşehir Belediyespor (2016–2017) 
In July 2016, Varnado joined the Los Angeles Lakers for the 2016 NBA Summer League. On August 30, 2016, Varnado was reported to have signed with İstanbul Büyükşehir Belediyespor of the Turkish Basketball Super League (BSL). On February 5, 2017, Varnado was reported to have parted-way with İstanbul Büyükşehir Belediyespor.

Tecnyconta Zaragoza (2017–2018) 
On August 2, 2017, Varnado was reported to have signed a one-year deal with Tecnyconta Zaragoza of the Liga ACB. On March 20, 2018, Varnado was reported to have parted-way with Tecnyconta Zaragoza. after Varnado suffered from a plantar fascia injury in his left foot.

Memphis Hustle (2018–2019) 
On November 30, 2018, Varnado signed with the Memphis Hustle of the NBA G League.

Fos Provence (2019) 
On January 15, 2019, Varnado parted ways with the Hustle to join Fos Provence of the French LNB Pro A, where he averaged 9.8 points, 4.8 rebounds and 1.5 blocks in 18 games played.

Hapoel Gilboa Galil (2019–2020) 
On September 25, 2019, Varnado returned to Israel for a second stint, signing a one-year deal with Hapoel Gilboa Galil. Ha averaged 7.0 points, 5.2 rebounds, and 1.2 blocks per game.

Club Atlético Aguada (2021–present) 
On October 6, 2021, Varnado signed with Club Atlético Aguada of the Liga Uruguaya de Básquetbol.

NBA career statistics

Regular season

|-
| style="text-align:left;"|
| style="text-align:left;"|Boston
| 5 || 0 || 3.6 || .500 || .000 || .500 || .6 || .2 || .2 || .0 || 1.2
|-
| style="text-align:left; background:#afe6ba;"|†
| style="text-align:left;"|Miami
| 8 || 0 || 5.0 || .333 || .000 || .000 || .8 || .3 || .0 || .3 || .3
|-
| style="text-align:left;"|
| style="text-align:left;"|Chicago
| 1 || 0 || 2.0 || .000 || .000 || .000 || .0 || .0 || .0 || .0 || .0
|-
| style="text-align:left;"|
| style="text-align:left;"|Philadelphia
| 23 || 0 || 14.7 || .600 || .000 || .519 || 2.7 || .6 || .4 || 1.3 || 4.3
|-
| style="text-align:left;" colspan="2"|Career
| 37 || 0 || 10.7 || .582 || .000 || .518 || 1.9 || .4 || .3 || .8 || 2.9

See also

List of NCAA Division I men's basketball career blocks leaders
List of NCAA Division I men's basketball season blocks leaders

References

External links
Serie A profile  Retrieved July 22, 2015

Mississippi State bio
RealGM profile
FIBA.com profile

1988 births
Living people
African-American basketball players
American expatriate basketball people in France
American expatriate basketball people in Israel
American expatriate basketball people in Italy
American expatriate basketball people in Spain
American expatriate basketball people in Turkey
American men's basketball players
Basket Zaragoza players
Basketball players from Tennessee
Basketball players from Virginia
Boston Celtics players
Centers (basketball)
Chicago Bulls players
Dinamo Sassari players
Fos Provence Basket players
Hapoel Gilboa Galil Elyon players
Hapoel Jerusalem B.C. players
Iowa Energy players
İstanbul Büyükşehir Belediyespor basketball players
Lega Basket Serie A players
Liga ACB players
Los Angeles D-Fenders players
Memphis Hustle players
Miami Heat draft picks
Miami Heat players
Mississippi State Bulldogs men's basketball players
Pallacanestro Virtus Roma players
People from Brownsville, Tennessee
Piratas de Quebradillas players
Pistoia Basket 2000 players
Philadelphia 76ers players
Power forwards (basketball)
Sioux Falls Skyforce players
Sportspeople from Fairfax, Virginia
Universiade medalists in basketball
Universiade bronze medalists for the United States
Medalists at the 2009 Summer Universiade
21st-century African-American sportspeople
20th-century African-American people